Moss Lane Cricket Ground was a cricket ground in Moss Side, Manchester, Lancashire. The first recorded match on the ground was in 1864, when Manchester Cricket Club played Sheffield Cricket Club.

In 1844, the ground held its inaugural first-class match when Manchester played Sheffield Cricket Club who were called Yorkshire on that occasion. From 1844 to 1846, the ground played host to four first-class matches, the last of which saw Manchester play Sheffield.

The final recorded match on the ground came in 1847 when Manchester Slow Bowlers played Manchester Fast Bowlers. The ground was later developed, with St Mary's Church covering the site today.

References

External links
Moss Lane Cricket Ground on CricketArchive
Moss Lane Cricket Ground on Cricinfo

Defunct cricket grounds in England
Defunct sports venues in Manchester
Sports venues completed in 1832
Demolished buildings and structures in Manchester
Demolished sports venues in the United Kingdom